The R-11 Zemlya, GRAU index 8A61 was a Soviet tactical ballistic missile. It is also known by its NATO reporting name SS-1b Scud-A. It was the first of several similar Soviet missiles to be given the reporting name Scud. Variant R-11M was accepted into service, with GRAU index 9K51.

Origin
The R-11 originated from a 1951 requirement for a ballistic missile with similar performance to the German V-2 rocket, but half its size. With the Wasserfall, an anti-aircraft version of the V-2, as a model the R-11 was developed by engineer Victor Makeev, who was then working in OKB-1, headed by Sergey Korolyov. The two men agreed on the use of RG-1 as the fuel, but disagreed over which oxidizer to use, with Korolev favouring the use of liquid oxygen, while Makeev advocated the use of a storable but toxic oxidizer. Makeev's version, that first flew on 18 April 1953, was fitted with an Isayev engine using RG-1 and nitric acid. On 13 December 1953, a production order was passed with SKB-385 in Zlatoust, a factory dedicated to producing long-range rockets. In June 1955, Makeev was appointed chief designer of the SKB-385 to oversee the programme and, in July, the R-11 was formally accepted into military service. The definitive R-11M, designed to carry a nuclear warhead, was accepted officially into service on 1 April 1958. The launch system received the GRAU index 9K51, the rocket itself 8K11, and the launcher 8U218.

Systems specification
Like the V-2, the R-11 relied on inertial guidance, and its flight was controlled by four graphite vanes in the engine exhaust, that were active only while the motor was burning. The R-11M had a maximum range of 270 kilometres, but when carrying a nuclear warhead, this was reduced to 170 kilometres, hence an alternative designation R-170. At maximum range, it was found to have an average range error 1.19 kilometres and an azimuth error of 0.66 kilometres. It was used as a mobile nuclear strike vector, giving the Soviet Army the ability to hit European targets from forward areas. To give the system sufficient mobility on the battlefield, the R-11 was mounted on the chassis of an IS-2 tank, that became its first transporter erector launcher 8U218. Main payload was a nuclear warhead with an estimated yield of 10, 20 or 40 kilotons. There was also HE-Frag warhead 9N33 with 535 kg of explosive.

Naval variant
A naval variant, the R-11FM was first tested at Kapustin Yar in February 1955, and was first launched from a converted Project 611 (Zulu class) submarine in September of the same year. While the initial design was done by Korolev's OKB-1, the programme was transferred to Makeyev's SKB-385 in August 1955. It became operational in 1959 as the D-1 launch system, the world's first submarine-launched ballistic missile (SLBM), and was deployed onboard Project 611 and Project 629 (Golf Class) submarines, until its replacement by the R-13 in 1961 (SS-N-4) and the R-21 (SS-N-5) in 1963. During its service, 77 launches were conducted, of which 59 were successful. The success of the R-11FM established Makeev as the main designer of submarine-launched weapons for the Soviet Armed Forces, and the R-11FM served with the first generation SLBM submarine units of the Soviet Navy.

See also
Hwasong-5
Hwasong-6
R-17 Elbrus
Scud

References

External links 
 Ballistic Missile Reference from the Federation of American Scientists
 Missile Threat: A Project of the George C. Marshall Institute
 R-11 / SS-1B SCUD-A

Chemical weapon delivery systems
Cold War missiles of the Soviet Union
Nuclear missiles of the Soviet Union
Rocket artillery
R-011
Military equipment introduced in the 1950s